This is a list of sheriffs and high sheriffs of Shropshire

The sheriff is the oldest secular office under the Crown. Formerly the high sheriff was the principal law enforcement officer in the county but over the centuries most of the responsibilities associated with the post have been transferred elsewhere or are now defunct so that its functions are now largely ceremonial. From 1204 to 1344 the Sheriff of Staffordshire served also as the Sheriff of Shropshire.

Under the provisions of the Local Government Act 1972, on 1 April 1974 the office previously known as sheriff was retitled high sheriff. The high sheriff changes every March.

Sheriff

11th century

 Warin the Bald
c. 1086  Rainald De Balliol, De Knightley (1040–1086)
1102 Hugh (son of Warin)

12th century
-1114: Alan fitz Flaad (died 1114)
1127–1137: Pain fitzJohn (died 1137)
1137–1138: William Fitz Alan (exiled 1138)
1155–1159: William Fitz Alan (died 1160)
1160–1165: Guy le Strange
1166–1169: Geoffrey de Vere
1170:Geoffrey de Vere and William Clericus
1171–1179: Guy le Strange
1180–1189: Hugh Pantulf, 4th Baron of Wem
1190–1201: William fitz Alan II (died 1210)

13th and 14th centuries

1204–1344 See High Sheriff of Staffordshire
1208 Reginald de Lega (acting)
1228 (or before) Henry de Deneston 
1228 Henry de Verdun (I)
1285: Sir Roger de Pulesdon (otherwise 'de Pyvelesdon') 
1354–1359 John de Burton 
1377: Sir John Burley
1377: Sir Bryan Cornwall of Burford, Shropshire
1378: John Ludlow
1379: John de Drayton
1380: Roger Hord
1381: John Shery
1382: Edward Acton of Longnor
1383: John de Stepulton
1384: Edward Acton of Longnor
1386: Nicholas de Sandford
1387: Robert de Lee
1388: John de la Pole (alias Mowetho), of Mawddwy and Wattlesborough
1388: Robert de Ludlow
1389: Edward Acton of Longnor
1390: John de Stepulton
1391: Sir William Hugford of Apley, Salop and Wilden, Beds
1392: Henry de Winesbury
1393: John de Eyton of Eyton upon the Weald Moors
1394: Thomas de Lee of South Bache in Diddlebury
1395: William Worthie
1396: Sir William Hugford of Apley, Salop and Wilden, Beds
1397–1398: Adamus de Pashal
1399: John Cornwall of Kinlet

15th century

16th century

17th century

18th century

19th century

20th century

High sheriffs

20th century

21st century

Footnotes

References
 The History of the Worthies of England volume 3

 
Local government in Shropshire
Shropshire
History of Shropshire
High Sheriff